With Special Guest Lauren Lapkus is an improvisational comedy podcast hosted by Lauren Lapkus where each week the guest is the host. Lapkus takes the guest role in each episode, allowing her guest host to decide the podcast's title, subject matter, and Lapkus's character. Regardless of the host, each episode of the podcast ends with a segment called "Help Me Rhonda", where Lapkus's recurring character Traci Reardon gives advice to her Twitter followers.

History
In 2012, Lapkus began making guest appearances on several podcasts on the Earwolf network, such as Comedy Bang! Bang! and improv4humans. In 2014, Earwolf approached Lapkus to host her own show and they signed her to a two-year contract. She explained, "Eventually they came to me and said, 'Do you want to do a podcast and what would you do?' I think it was just part of becoming a part of the family slowly over time".

The idea for the podcast's theme came from Lapkus's dislike of hosting things. In an interview with Jezebel, she described her thought process as "Oh, I want to do it, but I don't like hosting. That makes me feel weird and I don't want to interview people." Together with her husband, she came up with the concept of always being the guest.

When the podcast launched, Lapkus would come up with her own character in advance, but after a few episodes she decided it would be more cohesive to let the guest host decide her character and not tell her until they were recording. This forces her to improvise on the spot.

Lapkus has said that she "never expected to get into podcasts at all" and it is funny to her that she has one.

Episodes

2014

2015

2016

2017

2018

2019

References

External links
 

Audio podcasts
Comedy and humor podcasts
Earwolf
2014 podcast debuts
Improvisational podcasts
American podcasts